Andrica's conjecture (named after Dorin Andrica) is a conjecture regarding the gaps between prime numbers.

The conjecture states that the inequality

holds for all , where  is the nth prime number. If  denotes the nth prime gap, then Andrica's conjecture can also be rewritten as

Empirical evidence 
Imran Ghory has used data on the largest prime gaps to confirm the conjecture for  up to 1.3002 × 1016. Using a table of maximal gaps and the above gap inequality, the confirmation value can be extended exhaustively to 4 × 1018.

The discrete function  is plotted in the figures opposite. The high-water marks for  occur for n = 1, 2, and 4, with A4 ≈ 0.670873..., with no larger value among the first 105 primes. Since the Andrica function decreases asymptotically as n increases, a prime gap of ever increasing size is needed to make the difference large as n becomes large. It therefore seems highly likely the conjecture is true, although this has not yet been proven.

Generalizations 

As a generalization of Andrica's conjecture, the following equation has been considered:

where  is the nth prime and x can be any positive number.

The largest possible solution for x is easily seen to occur for n=1, when xmax = 1. The smallest solution for x is conjectured to be xmin ≈ 0.567148...  which occurs for n = 30.

This conjecture has also been stated as an inequality, the generalized Andrica conjecture:
 for

See also 
 Cramér's conjecture
 Legendre's conjecture
 Firoozbakht's conjecture

References and notes

External links 
 Andrica's Conjecture at PlanetMath
 Generalized Andrica conjecture at PlanetMath
 

Conjectures about prime numbers
Unsolved problems in number theory